Least trimmed squares (LTS), or least trimmed sum of squares, is a robust statistical method that fits a function to a set of data whilst not being unduly affected by the presence of outliers. It is one of a number of methods for robust regression.

Description of method 
Instead of the standard least squares method, which minimises the sum of squared residuals over n points, the LTS method attempts to minimise the sum of squared residuals over a subset, of those points. The unused  points do not influence the fit.

In a standard least squares problem, the estimated parameter values β are defined to be those values that minimise the objective function S(β) of squared residuals:

where the residuals are defined as the differences between the values of the dependent variables (observations) and the model values:

and where n is the overall number of data points. For a least trimmed squares analysis, this objective function is replaced by one constructed in the following way. For a fixed value of β, let  denote the set of ordered absolute values of the residuals (in increasing order of absolute value). In this notation, the standard sum of squares function is

while the objective function for LTS is

Computational considerations 
Because this method is binary, in that points are either included or excluded, no closed-form solution exists. As a result, methods for finding the LTS solution sift through combinations of the data, attempting to find the k subset that yields the lowest sum of squared residuals. Methods exist for low n that will find the exact solution; however, as n rises, the number of combinations grows rapidly, thus yielding methods that attempt to find approximate (but generally sufficient) solutions.

References 
 
 
 
 
 

Robust statistics
Robust regression